Jesse Cox (1986 – December 2017) was an Australian radio producer, broadcaster, and documentary maker.

Career
Throughout his broadcasting career, Jesse Cox worked for Sydney's FBi Radio, ABC Radio National, and was head of original content at Audible's APAC office. In 2012, Cox also formed his own company, Creative Nonfiction to explore digital storytelling. Cox's 2012 radio documentary for Radio National's 360documentaries, Keep Them Guessing, won the Directors' Choice Award in the 2013 Third Coast / Richard H. Driehaus Foundation Competition. Cox's radio documentary The Real Tom Banks won the Best Documentary - Silver Award at the 2014 Third Coast International Audio Festival. This international award for creative audio works was judged by This American Life presenter, Ira Glass. Other radio programs and podcasts Cox worked on include Radiotonic, This is About, All the Best and Long Story Short. 

Cox also created the documentary theatre show Wael Zuaiter Unknown, which he performed live as part of the 2014 Next Wave Festival. The Sydney Morning Herald called Cox "a storyteller of great sensitivity and intelligence" in their review of this show. 

Cox created geo-locative smartphone audio works such as Ghosts of Biloela, which was shortlisted for the 2017 NSW Premier's History Awards in the Multimedia History Prize category and described by the State Library of NSW judges as "an innovative, contemporary avenue to history...accessible to a broad audience". 

Cox won the 2017 'Innovation' Walkley Award for his role as executive producer of the ABC Radio National true-crime Trace podcast, alongside Rachael Brown and Jeremy Story Carter. In 2017, Director of ABC Radio, Michael Mason, described Trace as "ABC's most successful podcast".  

His work has been included in Next Wave Festival, Art & About, Underbelly Arts and Sculpture by the Sea.

Death
Jesse Cox died suddenly in December 2017 from a rare soft tissue cancer in his brain. His legacy is kept alive by his wife and child.

Awards

|-
| 2013
| Keep Them Guessing radio documentary
| Third Coast / Richard H. Driehaus Foundation Competition : Directors' Choice Award
| 
|-
| 2014
| The Real Tom Banks radio documentary
| Third Coast International Audio Festival : Best Documentary - Silver Award 
| 
|-
| 2017
| Ghosts of Biloela
| NSW Premier's History Awards : Multimedia History Prize
| 
|-
| 2017
| Trace podcast
| Walkley Award : Innovation Award
|

References

1986 births
2017 deaths
Australian radio producers
ABC radio (Australia) journalists and presenters
Walkley Award winners